Elena Butnaru (born 27 April 1975) is a retired Romanian female volleyball player, who played as a middle blocker. 

She was part of the Romania women's national volleyball team at the 2002 FIVB Volleyball Women's World Championship in Germany. 
She also competed at the 2001 Women's European Volleyball Championship and 2005 Women's European Volleyball Championship. On club level she played with Pallavolo Palermo.

Clubs
  1997-1999 	Pitesti
  1998-2000 	Krajova 
  1999-2000 	Rio Marsì Palermo 	
  2000-2001 	Rio Marsì Palermo
  2001-2002 	Pallavolo Palermo 	
  2002-2003 	Damesa Burgos
  2003-2004 	Scavolini Pesaro
  2004-2006 	Las Palmas 
  2006-2007 	Valencia
  2007-2009 	CV Sanse   
  2009-2010 	Chateau d'Ax Urbino Volley

References

External links
 http://todor66.com/volleyball/World/Women_2002.html
 http://www.legavolleyfemminile.it/?page_id=194&idat=BUT-ELE-75
 http://www.fivb.org/vis_web/volley/wwch2002/pdf/match018.pdf
 http://www.voleiromania.ro/stiri/elena-butnaru-revine-in-voleiul-romanesc-580.html

1975 births
Living people
Romanian women's volleyball players
Sportspeople from Baia Mare